CHPP may refer to:

 Certified Homeland Protection Professional, a certification in homeland security
 Coal handling and preparation plant, another term for a coal preparation plant
 Combined heat and power plant, a term for a cogeneration facility 
 Continuous hyperthermic peritoneal perfusion, a procedure in which the abdominal cavity is bathed in warm fluid that contains anticancer drugs
 Certified Hattrick Product Providers, functions that work with the Hattrick massively multiplayer online football management game